The 1938 City of London by-election was a by-election held on 6 April 1938 for the British House of Commons constituency of City of London, which covered the "Square Mile" which was the United Kingdom's traditional financial district.

The by-election was caused by the death of one of the City's two Conservative Party Members of Parliament (MPs) Thomas Vansittart Bowater, who had held the seat since a by-election in 1924, having contested the seat in an earlier by-election in 1922.

The Conservative candidate, Sir George Broadbridge, who had been Lord Mayor of London in 1936, was returned unopposed.

Election results

References

See also 
 List of United Kingdom by-elections
 City of London constituency
 1922 City of London by-election
 1924 City of London by-election
 1935 City of London by-election
 1940 City of London by-election
 1945 City of London by-election

City of London,1938
City of London by-election
Unopposed by-elections to the Parliament of the United Kingdom (need citation)
City of London by-election
City of London,1938
City of London,1938